Platylesches langa, the dark peppered hopper or irrorated hopper, is a butterfly in the family Hesperiidae. It is found in northern Nigeria, the Democratic Republic of the Congo (Shaba), southern Tanzania, Malawi, eastern Zambia and Zimbabwe. The habitat consists of woodland.

Adults are on wing year round.

References

Butterflies described in 1937
Erionotini